Peritresius is an extinct genus of sea turtle from the Late Cretaceous deposits in the US Eastern Seaboard.

Taxonomy
Two species are known, Peritresius ornatus Leidy, 1856 and P. martini Gentry, Parham, Ehret, and Ebersole, 2018, both from Campanian-Maastrichtian age deposits in New Jersey, Alabama, and Mississippi.

References

Cheloniidae
Cretaceous turtles
Extinct animals of the United States
Prehistoric turtle genera
Taxa named by Joseph Leidy
Extinct turtles